Landscape of Farewell is a 2007 novel by the Australian author Alex Miller.

Awards and nominations

Commonwealth Writers Prize, South East Asia and South Pacific Region, Best Book, 2008: shortlisted 
Miles Franklin Literary Award, 2008: shortlisted 
New South Wales Premier's Literary Awards, Christina Stead Prize for Fiction, 2008: shortlisted 
Australian Literature Society Gold Medal, 2008: shortlisted
Australia-Asia Literary Award, 2008: longlisted

Reviews
"The Age" 
"The Australian" 1 
"The Australian" 2 
"The Sydney Morning Herald"

References

Novels by Alex Miller
2007 Australian novels